Juan Ramón Paredes Zelaya (born 23 May 1950) is a former Salvadoran professional football player and currently manager.

Coaching career

Alianza
He became the coach of Alianza at the beginning of 2000 season, he went on to win the Apertura 2001 in the process becoming the first and so far only Salvadoran to win a title with Alianza as coach. He took the team to several final series before quitting the club to become coach of the El Salvador national team.

Paredes led the El Salvador team to the Central American and Caribbean titles in 2002.

He quit as manager of Independiente Nacional 1906 in September 2006.

Once Municipal
Juan Ramón Paredes was signed as coach of Once Municipal  on 10 March 2008 after the shock resignation of Hugo Coria. However Juan Ramón Paredes could not reverse the terrible form slump of Once Municipal  after only 8 matches in charge with only 3 draws and 5 losses to show for it (including a 5-2 defeat by Isidro Metapán). Paredes resigned as coach on 27 April.

Other Coaching Duties
In October 2009 he replaced Victor Girón at Fuerte Aguilares and in May 2010 Paredes signed up with fellow Second division side Municipal Limeño for the remainder of the 2010 Clausura season. In October 2010 he joined Atlético Marte, replacing Luis Guevara Mora who was moved upstairs to become Director of Sports.

Alianza
Paredes has been given again coaching duties in Alianza after the team losing the clásico against Águila at home. Paredes is replacing interim coach Cárcamo Batres.

Titles

References

1950 births
Living people
People from La Libertad Department (El Salvador)
Salvadoran footballers
Expatriate soccer players in the United States
Salvadoran expatriate sportspeople in the United States
Salvadoran expatriate footballers
Salvadoran football managers
C.D. Águila managers
Municipal Limeño managers
El Salvador national football team managers
Association footballers not categorized by position